Valeria is a Venezuelan-American telenovela produced by Venevisión Productions. The telenovela premiered on Univision on March 10, 2009, at the 2pm/1c timeslot.

Filming of the telenovela ended in September 2008, and it was first released in June 2008 in Ecuador. It aired in Venezuela on July 14, 2009, on Venevisión Plus at the 10pm timeslot with re-airings at 1pm timeslot. It also aired in Spain, Peru, El Salvador, Romania, Croatia, and other countries.

Characters of Leopoldo and Manon are played by the two siblings – Jorge Reyes and his sister Claudia.

Plot
Leopoldo, member of the Riquelme family, and Valeria, daughter of a poor worker, will have to fight temptations and other situations that force them apart in order to find true love in Miami, because she was raped by Leopoldo's brother Juan Ignacio, who is in protection by his father Samuel, very rich advocate.

Cast
 Alejandra Lazcano as Valeria Hidalgo, daughter of Hilda and Julio, mother of Laurita, in love with Leopoldo
 Jorge Reyes as Leopoldo Riquelme, son of Piedad and Alfredo, in love with Valeria, father of Laurita
 Carolina Tejera as Miroslava Montemar de Riquelme, in love with Lepoldo, hates Valeria, ends up in an asylum and dies of heart attack
 Bobby Larios as David Barrios, in love with Valeria but then with Manon, best friend of Leopoldo
 Fernando Carrera as Samuel Riquelme, killed by Estrella in defense
 Leonardo Daniel as Renato Rivera, a doctor, in love with Estrella, killed on order of Samuel
 Mara Croatto as Estrella Granados, Samuel's lover and real mother of Tatiana
 Flavio Caballero as Alfredo Galan, ex-boyfriend of Piedad and priest, real father of Leopoldo
 Jorge Luis Pila as Salvador Rivera, in love with Tatiana, married Raquel, then Tatiana
 Rosalinda Rodríguez as Hilda de Hidalgo
 Flor Elena González as Piedad de Riquelme
 Claudia Reyes as Manon Álvarez
 Grettel Trujillo as Mariela, ends up in jail
 Griselda Noguera as Teresa
 Shirley Budge as Scarlet, in love with Leopoldo
 Carla Rodríguez as Lolita, ends up in jail
 Mariana Huerdo as Angelita
 Ivelín Giro as Jessica, in love with Leopoldo, dies frozen
 Eduardo Ibarrola as Julio Hidalgo
 José Antonio Coro as Felipe
 William Colmenares as Hugo, associated with Miroslava and Samuel
 Carlos Miguel Caballero as Juan Ignacio Riquelme, Samuel's son, wants to kill him, killed by Julio to save Valeria
 Julián Gil as Daniel Ferrari, villain, but then good, dies of cancer
 Liana Iniesta as Tatiana Riquelme, daughter of Samuel and Estrella
 Ximena Duque as Ana Lucía Hidalgo, Valeria's sister, in love with Isidro, has a baby with Isidro
 Christian Carabias as Tony Carvajal, dies frozen with Jessica
 Robert Avellanet as Guillermo "Iguana" Tovar
 Alberto Quintero as Isidro Morales 
 Eric Sant as Alex Hidalgo, brother of Valeria Killed by Juan Ignacio
 Dayana Garroz as Raquel
 Alba Galindo as Nancy Mistral
 Ivonne Montero as María Inmaculada/Coral, Valeria's cousin, in love with Leopoldo, hates Julio, Valeria and Hilda, killed by rapist, strangled
 Nury Flores as Hipólita

Broadcasters

See also
List of films and television shows set in Miami
List of programs broadcast by Venevisión

References

2009 American television series debuts
2009 American television series endings
2009 telenovelas
2009 Venezuelan television series debuts
2009 Venezuelan television series endings
Spanish-language American telenovelas
Spanish-language mass media in Florida
Television shows filmed in Miami
Television shows set in Miami
Univision telenovelas
Venevisión telenovelas
Venezuelan telenovelas
American telenovelas